was the Japanese Army surgeon inspector general.

Biography
He was born in Fukushima in 1845. He died in 1941 at the age of 96.

References

1845 births
1941 deaths
Japanese Army officers
People from Fukushima, Fukushima
Japanese military doctors